Tony Sheldon (born 12 September 1955) is an Australian actor/singer best known for his work in theatre; he is also a writer.

Career 
Sheldon comes from one of Australia's leading theatrical families: his mother is Toni Lamond, his aunt Helen Reddy, and his grandmother Stella Lamond.

He won the 2005 Helpmann Award, the Sydney Critics Award, the Mo Award and the Glugs Award for his performance as Roger de Bris in The Producers. He was also nominated for a Helpmann and a Green Room Award for his work in The Witches of Eastwick in 2003. He wrote and directed The Times of My Life at the Ensemble Theatre (2006) and the Adelaide Cabaret Festival for his mother, Toni Lamond.

Sheldon played more than 1,700 performances as Bernadette in Priscilla Queen of the Desert in Sydney, Melbourne, Auckland, West End (2009) and Toronto prior to the Broadway premiere in March 2011. He won the Green Room Award, Best Male Artist in a Leading Role, and was nominated for an Olivier Award (2010, London). He was nominated for the Tony Award as Best Actor in a Musical for his performance in Priscilla on Broadway. As part of the tenth anniversary tour in Australia presented by Michael Cassel Group, Tony performed his 1800th performance as Bernadette in Melbourne on 7 March 2018 and hit the milestone of 1900 performances in the role on Wednesday 20 June at the Capitol Theatre in Sydney. 
He played Dufayel in the musical adaption of Amélie.
Starting in 2019 he played Grandpa Joe in the Australian production of Charlie and the Chocolate Factory.

Personal life 
Sheldon and his long-term partner, actor and playwright Tony Taylor, have been together for 38 years.

Awards and nominations
Broadway, "Priscilla", 2011
Tony Award-Leading Actor in a Musical (nomination)
Drama League-Outstanding Performance (nomination)
Drama Desk- Leading Actor in a Musical (nomination)
Outer Critics Circle Award-Leading Actor in a Musical (nomination)
Theatre World Award (winner)

West End, Priscilla, 2009
Oliver Award – Leading Performance in a Musical (nomination)
What's on Stage Award – Leading Performance in a Musical (nomination)
  
Australia, Priscilla, 2006/7
Sydney Theatre Critics Award – Best Actor in a Musical (winner)
Greenroom Award – Best Actor in a Musical (winner)
Mo Award – Musical Theatre Performer of the Year (winner)
Glugs Award – Best Actor in a Musical (winner)
Aussietheatre.com – Best Actor in a Musical (winner)
Helpmann Award for Best Male Actor in a Musical (nomination)
Australian Dance Award – (nomination)

2005, The Producers
Helpmann Award for Best Male Actor in a Supporting Role in a Musical (winner)
Mo Award – Best Featured Actor in a Musical (winner)
Sydney Theatre Critics Award – Best Featured Actor in a Musical (winner)
Glugs Award – Best Featured Actor in a Musical (winner)
Greenroom Award – Best Featured Actor in a Musical (nomination)

2003, The Witches of Eastwick
Helpmann Award for Best Male Actor in a Supporting Role in a Musical (nomination)
Greenroom Award – Best Featured Actor in a Musical (nomination)

1994
Glugs Award – Best Actor in a Play, A Poor Student (winner)
Greenroom Award – Best Supporting Actor in a Musical, Falsettos

1991, Wherefore Art Thou, Cabaret?
Mo Award – Performer of the Year (nomination)
Mo Award – Best Actor in a Musical (nomination)

1985, Madonna and Child
Greenroom Award – Best Actor in a Musical (nomination)
Greenroom Award – Best Director of a Musical (nomination)

1984, Torch Song Trilogy
Greenroom Award – Best Actor in a Play (winner)
Variety Club Heart Award – Actor of the Year (winner)
Sidney Myer Award – Contribution to Sydney Theatre (nomination)

1977, Inner Voices
National Theatre Award – Best Actor in a Play (winner)
Sydney Theatre Critics Award – (winner)

Discography

Cast albums and soundtracks 
 The Venetian Twins - original cast (1979)
 I Love My Wife - original Australian cast (1982)
 Once In A Blue Moon - a celebration of Australian musicals (1994)
 Lift Off Live (1995)
 Songs from Fame the musical - Australian cast (1999)
 Priscilla, Queen of the Desert - original Australian cast (2007)
 Priscillla, Queen of the Desert - original Broadway cast (2011)
 Man of La Mancha - Australian cast (2015)

Select filmography
Spoiled (1974)

References

External links

Biography, Magnormos

Australian male stage actors
Australian male musical theatre actors
Helpmann Award winners
Australian LGBT singers
Australian gay actors
Australian gay musicians
Gay singers
Male actors from Brisbane
Musicians from Brisbane
Living people
1955 births
Dora Mavor Moore Award winners
People educated at Cranbrook School, Sydney
Theatre World Award winners
20th-century Australian LGBT people
21st-century Australian LGBT people